The 2022 Ilkley Trophy was a professional tennis tournament played on outdoor grass courts. It was the 6th edition of the tournament which was part of the 2022 ATP Challenger Tour and the 2022 ITF Women's World Tennis Tour. It took place in Ilkley, United Kingdom between 13 and 19 June 2022.

Champions

Men's singles

  Zizou Bergs def.  Jack Sock 7–6(9–7), 2–6, 7–6(8–6).

Men's doubles

  Julian Cash /  Henry Patten def.  Ramkumar Ramanathan /  John-Patrick Smith 7–5, 6–4.

Women's singles

  Dalma Gálfi def.  Jodie Burrage, 7–5, 4–6, 6–3

Women's doubles

  Lizette Cabrera /  Jang Su-jeong def.  Naiktha Bains /  Maia Lumsden, 6–7(7–9), 6–0, [11–9]

Men's singles main-draw entrants

Seeds

 1 Rankings are as of 6 June 2022.

Other entrants
The following players received wildcards into the main draw:
  Arthur Fery
  Felix Gill
  Aidan McHugh

The following players received entry into the singles main draw as special exempts:
  Jordan Thompson
  Tim van Rijthoven

The following player received entry into the singles main draw using a protected ranking:
  Sebastian Ofner

The following players received entry from the qualifying draw:
  Zizou Bergs
  Charles Broom
  Gijs Brouwer
  Daniel Cox
  Rinky Hijikata
  Daniel Masur

The following players received entry as lucky losers:
  Borna Gojo
  Alexei Popyrin

Women's singles main draw entrants

Seeds

 1 Rankings are as of 6 June 2022.

Other entrants
The following players received wildcards into the singles main draw:
  Jodie Burrage
  Sonay Kartal
  Yuriko Miyazaki
  Mingge Xu

The following player received entry into the singles main draw using a protected ranking:
  Yanina Wickmayer

The following players received entry from the qualifying draw:
  Anna Brogan
  Priscilla Hon
  Danielle Lao
  Maia Lumsden
  Diāna Marcinkēviča
  Mandy Minella
  Ranah Akua Stoiber
  Aldila Sutjiadi

References

External links
 2022 Ilkley Trophy at ATPtour.com
 2022 Ilkley Trophy at ITFtennis.com
 Official website

2022 ATP Challenger Tour
2022 ITF Women's World Tennis Tour
2022 in English tennis
June 2022 sports events in the United Kingdom
Aegon Ilkley Trophy